This is a list of Canadian films which were released in 1975:

See also
 1975 in Canada
 1975 in Canadian television

References

1975
Canada
1975 in Canada